The 1937 Soviet Cup was an association football cup competition of the Soviet Union.

Competition schedule

First round
 [May 23] 
 Lokomotiv Vologda                    1-10 CDKA Moskva 
 SPARTAK Kiev                         7-3  Monolit Orekhovo-Zuyevo 
 [May 24] 
 Avangard Leningrad                   3-3  Spartak Minsk 
 Avangard Votkinsk                    0-8  DINAMO Kazan  
 DINAMO Batumi                        2-0  Stroitel Baku 
 DINAMO Gorkiy                        5-1  SelMash Lyubertsy
 Dinamo Ivanovo                       0-4  SPATAK-2 Moskva  
 DINAMO Kiev                          3-0  DKA Smolensk 
   [Pavel Komarov 1, Nikolai Makhinya 85, Konstantin Shchegodskiy 88] 
 DINAMO Kirov                         2-1  Krylya Sovetov Gorkiy 
   [V.Vedernikov, Tatarintsev – A.Tabakov] 
 DINAMO Krasnoyarsk                   4-2  Krylya Sovetov Irkutsk 
   [K.Litvinov 5, P.Leonov 30, 33, V.Sokolov 40 - ?] 
 Dinamo Kungur                        1-8  DINAMO Leningrad  
 Dinamo Kursk                         2-6  STALINETS Moskva           [aet] 
 Dinamo Lyubertsy                     1-3  TORPEDO Gorkiy 
   [? - Leonid Yefimov, Viktor Drozdov, Nikolai Dunayev] 
 Dinamo Minsk                         1-4  DINAMO Moskva 
   [Viktor Lakhonin 56 – Mikhail Semichastny 43, Sergei Ilyin 80, 88 pen, Alexei Ponomaryov 83] 
 DINAMO Odessa                        7-0  Krasnoye Znamya Orekhovo-Zuyevo 
   [Leonid Orekhov 10, Mikhail Malkhasov 20, Ivan Borisevich 40, Yuzef Sositskiy 50, Vladimir Tokar 60, ?, ?] 
 DINAMO Stalinabad                    2-1  Spartak Tashkent 
   [K.Pogorelov, P.Babich - ?] 
 Dinamo Voronezh                      0-1  SPARTAK Kharkov            [asdet] 
   [Anatoliy Lesnoi 133] 
 DKA Leningrad                        2-1  Krasnoye Znamya Moskva 
 DZERZHINETS Voroshilovgrad           4-2  Krasnaya Zarya Leningrad 
   [Nikolai Lakotosh-2, Vladimir Movchan, ? - Pyotr Grigoryev, ?] 
 GOLIFK Leningrad                     7-2  Metallurg Elektrostal 
 Industrialny Institut Novocherkassk  1-3  DINAMO Kharkov 
   [Semyonov 69 pen – Vasiliy Makarov 10, ?, ?] 
 KRASNOYE ZNAMYA Noginsk              4-1  Krasny Konditer Moskva 
 KRYLYA SOVETOV Moskva                3-0  Lokomotiv Kiev 
 Krylya Sovetov Rybinsk               1-9  SPARTAK Ivanovo 
 LOKOMOTIV Dnepropetrovsk             7-2  KIM Moskva 
 LOKOMOTIV Kharkov                    3-1  Avangard Leningrad 
 LOKOMOTIV Serpukhov                  2-1  Krylya Sovetov Zaporozhye 
 Lokomotiv Slavyansk-na-Kubani        0-6  DINAMO Rostov-na-Donu 
 LOKOMOTIV Tbilisi                    4-1  Dinamo Baku 
 Lokomotiv Yaroslavl                  1-5  KRASNOYE ZNAMYA Yegoryevsk 
   [M.Serdyukov 25 - ?] 
 Lokomotiv Yasinovataya               0-6  DINAMO Dnepropetrovsk 
 METALLURG Magnitogorsk               3-1  Dinamo Chelyabinsk 
 Metallurg Stalingrad                 2-3  TORPEDO Moskva             [aet] 
   [Sergei Protsenko 15, ? - ?] 
 NEFTYANIK Baku                       1-0  Dinamo Yerevan 
 SELMASH Kharkov                      1-0  Lokomotiv-2 Moskva         [aet]
   [Fyodor Morgunov 94] 
 SNIPER Kirov                         2-0  Zenit Izhevsk 
   [S.Kosaryov 25, ?] 
 SPARTAK Novosibirsk                  2-0  Metallurg Stalinsk   
 Spartak Saratov                      3-5  SPARTAK Kuibyshev          [aet] 
   [Ryazanov, Gusev, Serebryakov - ?] 
 Stal Konstantinovka                  2-5  METALLURG Moskva 
   [? – Grigoriy Fedotov 12, Pavel Kudryavtsev 17, Nikolai Kononenko 57, ?...] 
 Stalinets Leningrad                  1-2  AVANGARD Kramatorsk 
   [Konstantin Sazonov 75 – G.Korostynskiy 28, I.Korostylyov 72] 
 STROITEL Krivoi Rog                  w/o  Krasnaya Roza Moskva 
 Stroitel Yerevan                     1-6  TEMP Baku 
 Sudostroitel Nikolayev               0-4  LOKOMOTIV Moskva 
   [Viktor Novikov 50, Gaik Andriasov 55, Nikolai Ilyin 60, ?] 
 Sudostroitel Sevastopol              0-1  ZDOROVYE Kharkov 
   [Poluyanov 40] 
 Sudostroitel Sormovo                 0-3  SPARTAK Moskva 
   [Stepan Kustylkin 10, 20, Viktor Semyonov ?] 
 Temp Cheboksary                      1-9  DINAMO-2 Moskva 
   [Bespalov 59 – Nikolai Postavnin 16, 31, Savostyanov 22, 40, 65, Ukhmylov 43, Morozov 54, Mysin 71, Fursov 82 pen] 
 TORPEDO Izhevsk                      2-1  Spartak Gorkiy 
 Traktor Chelyabinsk                  2-3  DINAMO Omsk                [aet]
 TRAKTOR Kharkov                      1-0  Burevestnik Moskva 
 TRAKTOR Stalingrad                   9-1  Dinamo Saratov 
 ZENIT Kuibyshev                      2-0  Spartak Ryazan  
   [I.Kuznetsov 45, A.Chuprunov 65] 
 Zenit Taganrog                       1-9  DINAMO Tbilisi 
   [Bagnenko – Mikhail Berdzenishvili, Boris Paichadze, ?...] 
 ZIO Leningrad                        3-1  Dzerzhinets Kolomna 
 ZiS Kramatorsk                       1-6  SPARTAK Dnepropetrovsk 
 ZiS Leningrad                        2-5  STALINETS Kharkov 
 ZOLOTOPROFSOYUZ Chita                3-2  Stroitel Komsomolsk-na-Amure 
   [V.Antonov-2, V.Volkov-pen – M.Fedyushkin-2] 
 [May 25] 
 LOKOMOTIV Baku                       4-0  DKA Ashkhabad 
 Stakhanovets Stalino                 1-2  SPARTAK Leningrad 
   [Vasiliy Sidorov 33 - ?] 
 [May 26] 
 DINAMO Bolshevo                      2-1  Burevestnik Rostov-na-Donu 
 Dinamo Irkutsk                       0-2  DINAMO Novosibirsk  
 [May 27] 
 Stal Dnepropetrovsk                  0-2  ENERGIYA Moskva 
 ZiP Dnepropetrovsk                   0-1  PRAVDA Moskva

First round replays
 [May 26] 
 Avangard Leningrad                   1-3  SPARTAK Minsk

Second round
 [May 29] 
 SPARTAK Leningrad                    5-0  Pravda Moskva 
 [May 30] 
 Avangard Kramatorsk                  0-0  SelMash Kharkov 
 CDKA Moskva                          5-0  Torpedo Izhevsk 
   [Mikhail Kireyev 9, 19, 37, Nikolai Isayev 23 pen, ?] 
 Dinamo Batumi                        0-1  NEFTYANIK Baku 
 Dinamo Krasnoyarsk                   2-3  SPARTAK Novosibirsk 
   [V.Sokolov, P.Leonov – N.Volkov, Fomin, ?] 
 DINAMO Odessa                        3-1  Zdorovye Kharkov           [aet]
   [Mikhail Malkhasov 4, Leonid Orekhov 100 pen, 110 pen – G.Kulishov 80] 
 Dinamo Omsk                          1-5  DINAMO Kazan 
 DINAMO Rostov-na-Donu                8-1  Energiya Moskva 
 Dzerzhinets Bezhitsa                 4-6  SPARTAK Dnepropetrovsk     [aet] 
 DZERZHINETS Voroshilovgrad           2-1  Traktor Kharkov 
   [Movchan 20, Nosko 25 pen – Alexandr Moskalyov ?] 
 KRASNOYE ZNAMYA Noginsk              3-0  Spartak Minsk 
   [Glazkov 15, 35, Vasiliy Zharkov 65] 
 Krasnoye Znamya Yegoryevsk           0-3  DINAMO Moskva 
   [Vasiliy Smirnov 21, Alexei Ponomaryov 33, Mikhail Yakushin 68] 
 LOKOMOTIV Dnepropetrovsk             3-2  Metallurg Moskva 
   [Gotselyuk 10 pen, 70, Seryogin 81 – Kuzin 33, Selin 55] 
 Lokomotiv Kharkov                    1-6  LOKOMOTIV Moskva 
   [Mikhailichenko 6 – Mikhail Zhukov 40, 85, Pyotr Terenkov ?, ?...] 
 Lokomotiv Serpukhov                  1-5  DINAMO-2 Moskva 
   [Kryukov 73 – Savostyanov 10, Ukhmylov 25, Morozov 41, Shcherbov 64 – Lapshin 82] 
 LOKOMOTIV Tbilisi                    3-1  Temp Baku 
 Metallurg Magnitogorsk               0-5  DINAMO Leningrad 
   [Pyotr Dementyev 12, Pyotr Bykov 27, Nikolai Svetlov 38, Viktor Fyodorov 85 pen, ?] 
 Sniper Kirov                         0-8  GOLIFK Leningrad 
 Spartak Ivanovo                      1-2  DINAMO Gorkiy 
 SPARTAK Kharkov                      4-1  DKA Leningrad 
   [Anatoliy Lesnoi, Alexei Serov, Naum Knyazhevskiy, Ivan Serov – F.Ivanov] 
 SPARTAK Kiev                         w/o  Dinamo Dnepropetrovsk 
 Spartak Kuibyshev                    1-4  TORPEDO Moskva 
   [A.Semyonov 55 – Viktor Semyonov 12, ?..] 
 Stalinets Kharkov                    1-5  KRYLYA SOVETOV Moskva 
 STALINETS Moskva                     2-1  Spartak-2 Moskva 
   [Sergei Ivanov 20, ? 55 – Nikolai Zhigalin 81] 
 Stroitel Krivoi Rog                  0-3  DINAMO Kharkov 
 TORPEDO Gorkiy                       4-0  Zenit Kuibyshev 
   [Nikolai Dunayev 15, 25, 35, Viktor Drozdov ?] 
 ZiO Leningrad                        1-8  DINAMO Kiev 
   [? – Konstantin Shchegodskiy 10, 20, Makar Goncharenko 15, 35, 75, Ivan Kuzmenko 20, ?..] 
 [May 31] 
 Dinamo Kirov                         2-4  DINAMO Bolshevo 
 DINAMO Tbilisi                       4-1  Spartak Yerevan 
   [Mikhail Berdzenishvili 40, Boris Paichadze 60, Tengiz Gavasheli 70, Nikolai Somov 80 – Paruir Aroyan 30] 
 SPARTAK Moskva                       3-2  Traktor Stalingrad         [asdet]
   [Viktor Semyonov 50, Vladimir Stepanov 85, Georgiy Glazkov 127 – Alexandr Ponomaryov 22, Georgiy Shlyapin 58] 
 ZolotoProfSoyuz Chita                0-1  DINAMO Novosibirsk 
   [G.Smurov]  
 [Jun 3] 
 LOKOMOTIV Baku                       5-2  Dinamo Stalinabad

Second round replays
 [Jun 1] 
 AVANGARD Kramatorsk                  1-0  SelMash Kharkov 
   [G.Korotinskiy]

Third round
 [Jun 5] 
 CDKA Moskva                          2-1  Dinamo-2 Moskva 
   [Konstantin Malinin 72 pen] 
 KRYLYA SOVETOV Moskva                3-0  Dzerzhinets Voroshilovgrad 
   [?, ?, Fyodor Karasyov 74] 
 [Jun 6] 
 Dinamo Gorkiy                        0-5  DINAMO Kiev 
   [Viktor Shilovskiy 13, 60, 86, Konstantin Shchegodskiy 20, S.Kozinets (DG) 29 og]
 Dinamo Kharkov                       0-2  LOKOMOTIV Moskva 
   [? 46, Vasiliy Serdyukov 60] 
 DINAMO Moskva                        5-2  Torpedo Gorkiy 
   [Mikhail Semichastny 14, Vasiliy Smirnov 30 pen, Alexei Ponomaryov 44, Sergei Ilyin 45, 66 – Leonid Yefimov 6, 61] 
 DINAMO Tbilisi                       3-0  Neftyanik Baku 
   [Mikhail Aslamazov 4, Mikhail Berdzenishvili 10 pen, Boris Paichadze 68] 
 Spartak Dnepropetrovsk               0-1  DINAMO Rostov-na-Donu 
   [Sergei Dombazov 50] 
 SPARTAK Kharkov                      3-2  Lokomotiv Dnepropetrovsk   [aet] 
   [Alexei Serov 83, 85, Voronkov (L) 102 og – Vasiliy Gotsalyuk 25, 30] 
 SPARTAK Kiev                         3-0  Avangard Kramatorsk  
 Spartak Leningrad                    0-3  DINAMO Odessa 
   [Ivan Borisevich 22, Leonid Orekhov 42 pen, ?] 
 [Jun 7] 
 GOLIFK Leningrad                     2-1  Stalinets Moskva           [aet] 
 Spartak Moskva                       1-1  Krasnoye Znamya Noginsk 
   [Viktor Semyonov 80 – Ye.Glazkov 50] 
 TORPEDO Moskva                       2-1  Dinamo Bolshevo 
   [Viktor Listikov 23 pen, Konstantin Ryazantsev 51 – Viktor Osminkin 46] 
 [Jun 8] 
 Dinamo Leningrad                     0-1  SPARTAK Novosibirsk 
   [Dunayev 80] 
 LOKOMOTIV Tbilisi                    3-1  Lokomotiv Baku 
 [Jun 11] 
 DINAMO Kazan                         6-0  Dinamo Novosibirsk

Third round replays
 [Jun 9] 
 SPARTAK Moskva                       5-0  Krasnoye Znamya Noginsk 
   [Viktor Semyonov 8, 44, Leonid Rumyantsev 14, Vladimir Stepanov 80, Stanislav Leuta 85]

Fourth round
 [Jun 11] 
 DINAMO Kazan                         6-0  Spartak Novosibirsk 
 DINAMO Moskva                        3-2  GOLIFK Leningrad           [aet] 
   [Sergei Ilyin 71 pen, Vasiliy Smirnov 86, 96 pen – Leonid Noritsyn 57, Valentin Shelagin 58] 
 [Jun 12] 
 DINAMO Kiev                          4-2  Torpedo Moskva             [aet] 
   [Pyotr Laiko 16, Konstantin Shchegodskiy 63, 106, Ivan Kuzmenko 110 - ? 37, ? 73] 
 DINAMO Odessa                        4-0  Krylya Sovetov Moskva 
   [Yuzef Sositskiy 15, Makar Gichkin 19, Ivan Borisevich 30, 62] 
 DINAMO Tbilisi                       4-0  Lokomotiv Tbilisi 
   [Mikhail Berdzenishvili 32, 40 pen, Tengiz Gavasheli 57, Nikolai Somov 87]
 LOKOMOTIV Moskva                     2-0  Dinamo Rostov-na-Donu 
   [Gaik Andriasov 61, 79] 
 SPARTAK Kharkov                      4-0  Spartak Kiev 
   [Alexei Serov 15, 70, 83, Anatoliy Lesnoi 75] 
 [Jun 13] 
 CDKA Moskva                          1-0  Spartak Moskva             [aet] 
   [Mikhail Kireyev 118]

Quarterfinals
 [Jun 17] 
 LOKOMOTIV Moskva                     4-1  Spartak Kharkov 
   [Gaik Andriasov 20, 35, Pyotr Terenkov 37, 64 - ?] 
 [Jun 18] 
 CDKA Moskva                          3-1  Dinamo Odessa 
   [Nikolai Isayev 11, Konstantin Malinin 37 pen, Ivan Mitronov 59 – Leonid Orekhov 30]
 [Jun 19] 
 DINAMO Tbilisi                       2-1  Dinamo Kiev 
   [Mikhail Aslamazov 13, Mikhail Berdzenishvili 47 – Konstantin Shchegodskiy 84] 
 [Jun 20] 
 DINAMO Moskva                        5-1  Dinamo Kazan 
   [Sergei Ilyin 2, 88, Vasiliy Smirnov 47, Alexei Ponomaryov 50, Mikhail Semichastny 74 – Pavel Bogatyryov 25]

Semifinals
 [Jun 30] 
 CDKA Moskva                          0-1  DINAMO Tbilisi 
   [Boris Paichadze 83] 
 [Jul 13] 
 DINAMO Moskva                        4-1  Lokomotiv Moskva 
   [Vasiliy Smirnov 11 pen 30, Mikhail Semichastny 35, Mikhail Yakushin 85 – Mikhail Zhukov 65]

Final

External links
 Complete calendar. helmsoccer.narod.ru
 1937 Soviet Cup. Footballfacts.ru
 1937 Soviet football season. RSSSF

Soviet Cup seasons
Cup
Soviet Cup